The 1990–91 Temple Owls men's basketball team represented Temple University as a member of the Atlantic 10 Conference during the 1990–91 NCAA Division I men's basketball season. The team was led by head coach John Chaney and played their home games at McGonigle Hall. The Owls received an at-large bid to the NCAA tournament as No. 10 seed in the East region. Temple made a run to the Elite Eight before falling to North Carolina in the East regional final, 75–72. The team finished with a record of 24–10 (13–5 A-10).

Players, coaches, and managers of team were honored in 2016 to commemorate the 25th anniversary of the 1990–91 season.

Roster

Schedule

|-
!colspan=9 style=| Regular season

|-
!colspan=9 style=| Atlantic 10 Tournament

|-
!colspan=9 style=| NCAA Tournament

Rankings

Awards and honors
Mark Macon – AP Honorable Mention All-American, First-team All-Atlantic 10 (only player named 4x), Robert V. Geasey Trophy, East Region MOP, Temple all-time leading scorer (2,609 points)

NBA draft

References

Temple Owls men's basketball seasons
Temple
Temple
Temple
Temple